Alex or Alexander Lewis may refer to:

 Alex Lewis (linebacker) (born 1981), American football player
 Alex Lewis (offensive lineman) (born 1992), American football player
 Alex Lewis (musician) (born 1978), American musician
 Alexander Lewis (1822–1908), American businessman and mayor of Detroit, Michigan
 Alexander Lewis (actor), Australian actor